Onancock Historic District is a national historic district located at Onancock, Accomack County, Virginia. The district encompasses 267 contributing buildings, 2 contributing sites, and 2 contributing objects.  It includes most of the historic residential, commercial, and ecclesiastical buildings in the town of Onancock.  The buildings represent a variety of popular architectural styles including the Late Victorian, Greek Revival, and Federal styles. Notable buildings include Scott Hall (1778, 1921), Alicia Hopkins House (1830), Harmon House (c. 1825), Holly House (1860), Ingleside (1880s), Dr. Lewis Harmanson House (1899), Harbor Breeze (1912), First National Bank (1894, 1899, 1921), Roseland Theatre (c. 1940), Market Street Methodist Church (1882), Naomi Makemie Presbyterian Church (1895), the Charles E. Cassell designed Holy Trinity Episcopal Church (1882), Onancock Town Hall (c. 1930), Onancock High School (1921), and Onancock Post Office (1936).  Located in the district and separately listed are the Cokesbury Church, Hopkins and Brother Store and Ker Place.

It was added to the National Register of Historic Places in 1992.

References

Historic districts on the National Register of Historic Places in Virginia
Federal architecture in Virginia
Greek Revival architecture in Virginia
National Register of Historic Places in Accomack County, Virginia